Vishudha Rathrikal is a 2021 Malayalam language anthology film directed by S. Sunil. Released through the OTT platform Saina Play, the film takes on five subjects occurring over five nights.

Cast
Sandra Larwin as monisha
Sheethal Shyam
Honey Vinu 
Deepthi Kalyani
Monisha

Release
The film was released on 21 May 2021 through the OTT platform Saina Play.

References

2021 films
Indian anthology films
2020s Malayalam-language films